This Is for the White in Your Eyes is the debut studio album by Copenhagen-based Danish chamber pop band Choir of Young Believers, released in Denmark on September 1, 2008 on Tigerspring, in the United States and Europe on August 18, 2009 on Ghostly International, and in Japan on December 16, 2009 on art union.

Critical reception

This Is for the White in Your Eyes received largely positive reviews from contemporary music critics. At Metacritic, which assigns a normalized rating out of 100 to reviews from mainstream critics, the album received an average score of 77, based on 10 reviews, which indicates "generally favorable reviews".

Noel Murray of The A.V. Club gave the album a positive review, stating, "This Is for the White in Your Eyes is majestic and haunting in the best sense, as Makrigiannis uses strings, chopped-up percussion tracks, and his own multi-tracked voice to create the sense of a gradually unfolding moment. Makrigiannis lets notes hang, which, given the fragility of his voice, means he risks pushing a note so far that it cracks. And yet if there's one quality that unifies Choir of Young Believers' songs, it's precision. Makrigiannis' style makes a strong first impression, as his songs flow naturally from muted sorrow to booming emotion and back. He evokes the calm, the storm, and the aftermath."

Track listing

 "Claustrophobia" contains lyrics from "I Hold the Old" by Kim LAS.

Personnel
Main personnel
 Jannis Noya Makrigiannis – arrangement, bass, guitar, keyboard, lyrics, percussion, piano, vocals, writing
 Fridolin Tai Nordsø Schjoldan – arrangement, backing vocals, bass, drums, flute, keyboard, percussion, trumpet
 Anders Rhedin – arrangement, backing vocals, drums, guitar, keyboard, percussion, lyrics (1)
 Bo Rande – backing vocals, horns, keyboard
 Cæcilie Trier – backing vocals, cello
 Mette Sand Hersoug – backing vocals, flute, violin
 Jakob Millung – bass
 Casper Henning – drums, percussion
 Frederik Nordsø – percussion
 Lasse Herbst – percussion
 Nicolai Kleinerman Koch – piano

Additional personnel
 Jannis Noya Makrigiannis – engineering, mastering, production
 Fridolin Tai Nordsø Schjoldan – engineering, mastering, production
 Anders Rhedin – engineering, mastering, percussion, production
 Frederik Tao – mixing, mastering
 Nis Bysted – artwork
 Nis Sigurdsson – artwork

In popular culture
 "Hollow Talk" was featured in the opening and closing titles of Scandinavian television series The Bridge.

References

Choir of Young Believers albums
2008 debut albums
Ghostly International albums
Tigerspring albums